Mata Verde is a Brazilian municipality located in the state of Minas Gerais.

The city belongs to the mesoregion of Jequitinhonha and to the microregion of Almenara. It became a municipality in 1993. It is located on the boundary with the state of Bahia and is connected by dirt road to Divisópolis. To the north there are road connections with Encruzilhada in the state of Bahia. Neighboring municipalities are Bahia, Divisópolis and Bandeira. 

The main economic activities are cattle raising and subsistence farming. The GDP was R$19,450,000 in 2005. The main cash crop was coffee with  planted in 2006. There were 73 automobiles in 2007. One banking agency was listed for the same year. Most of the land was in natural pasture or woodland. Only seven of the farms had tractors in 2006. There was one public health center.  

Municipal Human Development Index: .604 (2000)
State ranking: 826 out of 853 municipalities as of 2000
National ranking: 4,593 out of 5,138 municipalities as of 2000
Degree of urbanization: 80.30
Illiteracy rate: 38.22 (population older than 15)
Percentage of urban homes connected to sewage system: 73.60%
Infant mortality rate: 33.06

See also
 List of municipalities in Minas Gerais

References

IBGE
Citybrazil
Social indicators for Mata Verde

Municipalities in Minas Gerais